Anderson Jorge Oliveira dos Santos (born 23 April 1972 in Além Paraíba, Minas Gerais) is a retired Brazilian sprinter who competed predominantly in the 400 metres. He represented his country at the 2004 Summer Olympics failing to qualify for the semifinals.

He has personal bests of 45.39 seconds outdoor (1999) and 47.47 seconds indoor (2001).

Competition record

References

1972 births
Living people
Brazilian male sprinters
Brazilian male hurdlers
Athletes (track and field) at the 2004 Summer Olympics
Olympic athletes of Brazil
Athletes (track and field) at the 1999 Pan American Games
Athletes (track and field) at the 2007 Pan American Games
Pan American Games medalists in athletics (track and field)
Pan American Games silver medalists for Brazil
Medalists at the 1999 Pan American Games
20th-century Brazilian people
21st-century Brazilian people